Debt dependence or debt dependency may refer to:

 Debt-trap diplomacy, a country's loss of autonomy due to imposed debt
 Debt bondage, the nonindependence or slavery of a person due to debt
 Debt slavery and the bible, historical and theological approach to debt slavery